Rana Mohammad Sohail is a Jatiya Party politician and the incumbent Member of Parliament of Nilphamari-3.

Career
Rana Mohammad Sohail was commissioned as an officer of Bangladesh Army in 1986. He graduated in MBA (Finance) from Institute of Business Administration (IBA) of the University of Dhaka in 1995. He voluntarily retired from the Army in 1996. Rana Sohail went to the United States of America (USA) in 1997 as an student of McCombs School of Business in the University of Texas at Austin. He graduated in MBA (Energy Finance) from McCombs School of Business in 1999. Mr. Sohail worked in several states until 2007 and then returned to Bangladesh. He worked in Dhaka till 2016. Rana Mohammad Sohail was elected to parliament from Nilphamari-3 as a Jatiya Party candidate on 30 December 2018.

References

Jatiya Party politicians
Living people
11th Jatiya Sangsad members
1966 births
Rajshahi Cadet College alumni
Bangladeshi military personnel